Russo may refer to:

Russo (surname)
Russo (footballer, 1915–1980), full name Adolpho Milman, Brazilian football forward and manager
Russo (footballer, born 1976), full name Ricardo Soares Florêncio, Brazilian football defender
Russo brothers (born 1970 and 1971), American directors, producers and screenwriters
Russo-, prefix relating to Russia or the Russians